The following Radiological protection instruments can be used to detect and measure ionizing radiation:
Ionization chambers
Gaseous ionization detectors
Geiger counters
Photodetectors
Scintillation counters
Semiconductor detectors

Radioactivity
Radiation protection